Chapin is an unincorporated community in Teton County, in the U.S. state of Idaho.

History
A post office called Chapin was established in 1896, and remained in operation until 1912. According to tradition, the community was named after one Mr. Chapin, a pioneer citizen.

Chapin's population was 125 in 1909.

References

Unincorporated communities in Teton County, Idaho